The Old Course Saco River is a  river in the towns of Fryeburg and Lovell in western Maine in the United States. It was the route of the Saco River until the early 1800s, when the river's current course (called at first the "Canal River") was dug to shorten its length considerably.

See also
List of rivers of Maine

References

Maine Streamflow Data from the USGS
Maine Watershed Data From Environmental Protection Agency

Rivers of Maine
Saco River
Rivers of Oxford County, Maine